Gilbert Bozon (19 March 1935 – 21 July 2007) was a French swimmer and Olympic medalist.

Career
Bozon was born in Troyes. He competed at the 1952 Olympic Games in Helsinki, where he received a silver medal in 100 m backstroke.

See also
 World record progression 200 metres backstroke

References

External links
 

1935 births
2007 deaths
Sportspeople from Troyes
French male backstroke swimmers
French male freestyle swimmers
Olympic swimmers of France
Swimmers at the 1952 Summer Olympics
Swimmers at the 1956 Summer Olympics
Olympic silver medalists for France
World record setters in swimming
European Aquatics Championships medalists in swimming
Medalists at the 1952 Summer Olympics
Olympic silver medalists in swimming
Mediterranean Games gold medalists for France
Swimmers at the 1951 Mediterranean Games
Swimmers at the 1955 Mediterranean Games
Mediterranean Games medalists in swimming
20th-century French people